Pongsak Rattanapong, better known by his nickname Aof (อ๊อฟ), is a Thai singer and actor who gained popularity through the first season of the Thai reality show Academy Fantasia. He is known for his soft voice and sensitive songs.

In 2009, Aof debuted in his musical, Lom Haichai, the Musical (The Breath), based on the songbook of Boyd Kosiyabong.

Personal life

Aof is openly gay. He came out in April 2013, after years of speculation.

Notes

References

1985 births
Living people
Pongsak Rattanapong
Pongsak Rattanapong
Pongsak Rattanapong
Pongsak Rattanapong
Pongsak Rattanapong
Pongsak Rattanapong
Pongsak Rattanapong
Male musical theatre actors
Pongsak Rattanapong
Gay musicians
Gay actors
20th-century LGBT people
21st-century LGBT people